NTC Arena formally known as AXA Aréna NTC and formerly known as Sibamac Arena and Aegon Arena for sponsorship reasons, is part of the Slovak National Tennis Centre in Bratislava, Slovakia. It has a capacity of 4,500 people.

It has hosted concerts and various tennis matches, including the 2005 Davis Cup final between Slovakia and Croatia.

Concerts

List of concerts

See also
 List of tennis stadiums by capacity

External links
NTC website

References

Tennis venues in Slovakia
Indoor arenas in Slovakia
Buildings and structures in Bratislava
Sport in Bratislava
2003 establishments in Slovakia
Sports venues completed in 2003